Benton is a city in and the county seat of Franklin County, Illinois. The population was 6,709 at the 2020 census.

History

Founding 
Benton, the county seat of Franklin County, took its name from the prominent senator from Missouri, Thomas Hart Benton (1782-1858). In 1902 the village became a city, and incorporated under the mayor/commissioner form of government.

Franklin County was platted in 1818, the year Illinois became a state, at twice its current size. It included the territory that is now Williamson County. In 1839 the county was split roughly in half and the county seat was permanently fixed "at a hill at the south end of Rowling's Prairie", the site of the future city of Benton.

The Franklin County Courthouse sat in the center of the Public Square. It was the fourth courthouse that served the people of Franklin County. The Italianate building was constructed in 1874–75 at a cost of $27,500.00

Much of Benton's growth in the past can be traced to the abundance of high sulfur coal, the presence of multiple railroads, rich soil and the industry of its people.

Major events 
On April 19, 1928, Benton was the site of the next-to-last public hanging in Illinois, when local gangster Charles Birger was executed on the gallows next to the county jail for the December 12, 1926 murder of Joe Adams, mayor of nearby West City. A replica of the gallows and hangman's noose were built by the late retired Old Ben Coal miner, businessman & carpenter, Birchard L. Wampler  (March 9, 1938 – June 29, 2010) and his son Birchard Neil Wampler. They remain standing today next to the old Franklin County Jail turned Museum.

In September 1963, George Harrison of The Beatles visited Benton while on vacation, the first time any member of the group visited American soil. He stayed at the home of his sister, Louise, at 113 McCann Street. The bungalow used to be the Hard Day's Nite Bed and Breakfast. During his trip he traveled from Benton to Fenton's Music Store in Mt. Vernon, IL to purchase a Rickenbacker 425 that later sold at auction for $657k. Harrison also performed with a band called "The Four Vests" at the Veterans of Foreign Wars hall in Eldorado, Illinois. In an interview, Harrison's sister Louise said "his real first visit to America was when he came to the Midwest in September 1963 and he met these wonderful, warm, friendly, real warm Midwesterners... school teachers, retired miners and all kinds of just wonderful people... and a little band. He had a fantastic time. He thought they were just wonderful people."

In April 1995, a KKK rally was held outside the Franklin County Courthouse in Benton that drew a crowd of about 400, though not all those in attendance were in support of the KKK. Two members of the KKK spoke negatively of Jews, Blacks, Gays, liberal politicians, and reporters. About 40 police officers were present for the event, and some were wearing riot gear.

In August 2017, a  commemorative mural of George Harrison was created and donated by California artist John Cerney. Cerney caught word of Harrison's memorable visit to the town on a Sirius radio program, which inspired Cerney's creation. The "highway art" can be found facing southbound traffic along Interstate 57. The project was completed just in time for tourists to admire it as they traveled through the city for the total solar eclipse of 2017.

In June 2020, following the murder of George Floyd, a Black Lives Matter protest was held at the Franklin County Courthouse in Benton. At the time of the protest, the courthouse was being prepared for demolition. The protest attracted a crowd of about 60 people. The protest came 25 years after the KKK rally (mentioned above) was held in the same spot.

Geography

Land and water area 

Benton Public Library 

Benton Public Library serves all residents of Benton High School District. 
www.benton.lib.il.us

The library has a program in which people can pay for brick to be engraved and used on its property, and the funds made go to the library.   

The library contains about 48,000 materials, including Books, Audio books, Magazines, Large Print Materials, and Music CDs. Access to computers is also available at the library.

Benton Public Park 
The Benton Public Park has a few playgrounds, and picnic areas, as well as tennis courts, basketball courts, and ball fields. The Public Park also has a paved walking path that loops around the ball fields. The park is located near a railroad, and a red caboose sits at the entrance of the park.

Media

Newspapers 
Benton and surrounding areas are served by two weekly local newspapers, The Benton News and The Benton Gazette.  Other newspapers such as The Southern Illinoisan serve Benton and much wider areas surrounding it.

Television news 
Benton does not have any news channels broadcast from the city.  Many news channels still do serve the Benton, Illinois area.  WSIL (channel 3), KFVS (channel 12), and Fox 23 (channel 23) are among the most popular channels that provide some local news for Benton.

Internet access 
Benton has multiple Internet Service Providers that provide Broadband internet.  There are nine total internet service providers available for residential usage.  Six of the internet service providers can offer broadband speeds (download of 25 Mbit/s).  Three offer speeds that higher than 100 Mbit/s.  The fastest internet service available is offered by NewWave at top speeds of 200Mbit/s.  Between all service providers with Broadband speeds they offer: DSL, cable, fixed wireless, and satellite internet.

Demographics

As of the census of 2000, there were 6,880 people, 2,938 households, and 1,824 families residing in the city. The racial makeup of the city was 98.72% White, 0.29% African American, 0.15% Native American, 0.28% Asian, 0.06% from other races, and 0.51% from two or more races. Hispanic or Latino of any race were 0.51% of the population.    
   
There were 2,938 households, out of which 26.6% had children under the age of 18 living with them, 47.7% were married couples living together, 11.4% had a female householder with no husband present, and 37.9% were non-families. 33.8% of all households were made up of individuals, and 18.9% had someone living alone who was 65 years of age or older. The average household size was 2.24 and the average family size was 2.86.    
   
In the city, the population was spread out, with 22.0% under the age of 18, 7.8% from 18 to 24, 24.7% from 25 to 44, 23.0% from 45 to 64, and 22.4% who were 65 years of age or older. The median age was 42 years. For every 100 females, there were 86.9 males. For every 100 females age 18 and over, there were 80.8 males.    
   
The median income for a household in the city was $44,795, and the median income for a family was $35,339. Males had a median income of $27,323 versus $19,403 for females. The per capita income for the city was $27,932. About 15.6% of families and 14.7% of the population were below the poverty line, including 27.6% of those under age 18 and 11.4% of those age 65 or over.

Notable people 

 Charlie Birger, bootlegger during prohibition, hanged on 19 April 1928 at the Franklin County Jail in Benton
 Lin Bolen, former vice president of NBC
 Carl Choisser, Illinois state representative, lawyer, and newspaper editor
 Doug Collins, NBA coach, player, broadcaster, and Olympic basketball player
 William A. Denning, Illinois Supreme Court justice and state legislator
 Gary Forby, Illinois State Senator
 Billy Grammer, Grand Ole Opry star
 Richard O. Hart, Illinois state representative and lawyer
 William L. Hungate, federal judge and congressman from Missouri
 John Malkovich, actor
 Shirley Marsh, Nebraska state senator
 Rodney K. Miller, television host for Small Town Big Deal
 Offa Neal, third baseman for the New York Giants
 Ernest J. Odum, Illinois state representative and lawyer
 Carl Scarborough, race car driver, born in Benton 
 Noble Threewitt, thoroughbred race horse trainer, born in Benton in 1911
 Herbert L. Upchurch, Illinois state legislator and educator
 Rich Yunkus, former basketball player

References

External links
Benton Evening News

Cities in Illinois
Cities in Franklin County, Illinois
County seats in Illinois
Populated places in Southern Illinois
Populated places established in 1841
1841 establishments in Illinois
Sundown towns in Illinois